Ayhan Şahenk (11 June 1929 – 1 April 2001) was a Turkish businessman and founder of the Doğuş Group.

Father of the current chairman of  Dogus Holding Ferit Şahenk. Founded Doğuş Holding in 1950. Through his leadership company invested in the fields of construction, banking, communication, tourism, food and automotive.

In 1992 he established a non-profit organization under his name, which focused on improvement on education.  Şahenk died on April 1, 2001 due to a heart attack. His final resting place is home town Niğde.

Some of his relatives from father's line are living outside of Turkey in Azerbaijan, Uzbekistan and Crimea.

References

External links 
 Ayhan Şahenk Foundation

1929 births
20th-century Turkish businesspeople
People from Niğde
2001 deaths
Ayhan